The Lute Player is a 1514-1516 oil on canvas painting by Giovanni Cariani, now in the Musée des Beaux-Arts in Strasbourg, France. Its inventory number is 236.

History
In 1899 Adolfo Venturi adjudged the work to be "too high quality to be by Cariani", but Wilhelm von Bode attributed it to Cariani. Bode acquired it from a private Venetian collection in 1890; it entered the Strasbourg museum the following year. Since then it has also been attributed to Giorgione or in 1932 by some art historians to Palma il Vecchio, but is now seen as sharing all the basic characteristics of works securely attributed to Cariani.

References

External links
Le Joueur de luth , presentation of the painting on the museum's website

1515 paintings
1516 paintings
Paintings in the collection of the Musée des Beaux-Arts de Strasbourg
Renaissance paintings
Italian paintings
Oil on canvas paintings
Genre paintings